Omloop van Borsele ("Circuit of Borsele") is an elite women's professional road bicycle race held annually since 2002 in Borsele, Netherlands.  Since 2012, the event also contains a time trial. The time trial is together with the GP Leende part of the Dutch national time trial competition.

Past winners Road Race

Past winners Time Trial

External links
 Official website
  (road race)
 CQranking.com (time trial)

 
Recurring sporting events established in 2002
2002 establishments in the Netherlands
Women's road bicycle races
Cycle races in the Netherlands
Cycling in Borsele